Limatula suteri is a species of bivalve mollusc in the family Limidae, the file shells or file clams.

References
 SealifeBase
 British Antarctic Survey - Map 
 Powell A. W. B., New Zealand Mollusca, William Collins Publishers Ltd, Auckland, New Zealand 1979 

Limidae
Bivalves of New Zealand
Molluscs described in 1908